This list of Copts includes notable Copts figures who are notable in their areas of expertise. For saints, please refer to Coptic Saints.

Performing arts 
 Rami Malek, actor
 Mena Massoud, actor
 Ash Atalla, British television producer
 Henry Barakat, director
 Khairy Beshara, director
 Youssef Dawoud, actor
 Sanaa Gamil, actress
 Maged El Kedwany, actor
 Asaad Kelada, Hollywood director
 Sandra Nashaat, director
 Yousry Nasrallah, director
 Hany Ramzy, actor
 Daoud Abdel Sayed, film director
 Hala Sedki, actress
 George Sidhom, actor
 Nabila Erian, Opera singer

Businessmen 
 Nader Anise, founder of Coptic American Chamber of Commerce (Coptic Chamber) and attorney
 Tharwat Bassily
 Michael Ebeid
 Monir Fakhri Abdel Nour, banker and businessman
 Fayez Sarofim, billionaire, Houston financier
 Onsi Sawiris, founder of Orascom Group, Patrick of Sawiris Family 
 Naguib Sawiris, one of the wealthiest 100 people worldwide
 Samih Sawiris, Orascom Tourism
 Nassef Sawiris, Orascom Construction & Industrial. The richest man in Egypt
 Farid Stino
 Youssry Henien, Windsor Family Office. Banker and Businessman.
 Ayad B. Saad, Morgan Stanley, Senior Vice President, Financial Advisor.

Clergy and theologians 
 Anthony the Great, founder and pioneer of Christian monasticism 
 Athanasius the Apostolic, 20th Pope of Alexandria
 Cyril I, 24th Pope of Alexandria
Dioscorus the Great, 25th Pope of Alexandria
 Pope Cyril VI, 116th Pope of Alexandria
 Pope Shenouda III of Alexandria, 117th Pope of Alexandria
 Mother Irini
 Father Matta El Meskeen
 Father Makary Younan
 Father Bishoy Kamel
 Origen, Christian scholar
 George Habib Bebawi, Patrologist and Biblical scholar
 Metropolitan Mikhail of Asyut
 Metropolitan Athanasius of Beni Suef
 Bishop Serapion
 Bishop Missael
 Bishop Angaelos
 Pope Tawadros II

Lawyers and judges 
 Adel Bestavros, late lawyer and member of Coptic Lay and Endowment Councils
 Sami Farag
 Nabil Mounir Habib, represented Naguib Mahfouz, George Habib Bebawi, and is prominent in Egyptian law
 Sherrie Mikhail Miday

Social activists 
 Ester Fanous
 Alber Saber
 Akram Habib

Engineers 
 Hani Azer
 Michel Bakhoum
 William Selim Hanna
 Nabih Youssef
 Adel Sedra

Scientists 
 Azer Bestavros
 Rushdi Said
 Edward Tawadros

Architects 
 Michel Bakhoum
 Ramses Wissa Wassef

Historians and Coptologists 

 Aziz Suryal Atiya
 Iris Habib Elmasry
 Gawdat Gabra
 Habib Girgis
 Labib Habachi
 Pahor Labib
 Severus Ibn al-Muqaffa
 Younan Labib Rizk
 Father Menassa Youhanna
 Bishop Isidoros

Journalists and writers 
 Anouar Abdel-Malek
 Louis Awad
 Alfred Farag
 Mofeed Fawzy
 Waguih Ghali
 Adel Iskandar
 Magdi Khalil
 Kamal el-Mallakh
 Raouf Salama Moussa
 Salama Moussa
 Ra'ouf Mus'ad
 Younan Labib Rizk
 Youssef Sidhom
 Said Sonbol
 Magdi Wahba

Musicians 
 Wagih Aziz
 Mikhail Girgis El Batanouny
 Halim El-Dabh
 Youssef Elsisi
 Yusef Greiss
 Adel Kamel
 Ragheb Moftah
 Osama Mounir
 Aziz El-Shawan
 Joseph Tawadros
 Ramzi Yassa
 Nabila Erian
 Lara Scandar

Painters and artists 
 Kamal Amin
 Hany Armanious
 Evelyn Ashamallah
 George Bahgoury
 Chafik Charobim
 Isaac Fanous
 Margaret Nakhla
 Adel Nassief
 Adam Henein

Politicians 
 Stephan Bassily 
 Boutros Boutros Ghali
 Youssef Boutros Ghali
 Makram Ebeid
 Akhnoukh Fanous
 Ester Fanous
 Boutros Ghali
 Jirjis al-Jawhari
 Ibrahim El-Gohary
 Rafik Habib, Egyptian researcher, activist, author, and politician
 Wassef Hinein
 George Isaac (politician)
 Georgette Kellini
 Monir Fakhri Abdel Nour
 Dina Powell
 Hala Shukrallah
 Kamal Stino
 Moheb Stino
 Mourad Wahba
 Youssef Wahba
 Peter Khalil, Labor MP, Australia

Physicians 
 Nagy Habib
 Magdy Ishak 
 Naguib Pasha Mahfouz
 Marty Makary
 Hilana Sedarous
 Gorgi Sobhi
 Sir Magdi Yacoub
 Paul Ghalioungui
 Moawad GadElrab

Athletes 
 Nagui Asaad
 Hisham Greiss
 Hany Ramzy
 Farid Simaika
 Sam Soliman

Celebrity chefs 
 Karine Bakhoum
 Christopher Maher
 Michael Mina

Others 
 Charlotte Wassef, Miss Egypt 1934 and Miss Universe 1935
 Meriam George, Miss Egypt 2005
 Nick Kaldas, retired Deputy Commissioner
 Fathia Nkrumah, wife of Kwame Nkrumah, Ghana's first president, born Fathia Rizk
 Mohammed Hegazy, Egyptian Muslim convert to Christianity
 Lara Debbane, Miss Egypt 2014
 Daniel Wassef, Guinness World Record holder

See also 
 Coptic diaspora
 List of Coptic saints
 Coptic Orthodox Church
 Pope of the Coptic Orthodox Church
 List of Coptic Orthodox Popes
 Coptic language
Coptic people
Christianity in Egypt
Copts in Sudan
Copts in Libya

References 

Religion-related lists
Lists of Egyptian people
Lists of Christians
Lists of Oriental Orthodox Christians